File 03 is a 2001 EP from hardcore punk band The Hope Conspiracy.

Track listing
"No Love Goes Unpunished"
"Treason"
"It Meant Nothing"
"Divinity Sickness"
"Regret Kills"
"Escapist"

Sources 
 File 03 On Yahoo! Music

2001 EPs
The Hope Conspiracy albums
Albums with cover art by Jacob Bannon
Bridge 9 Records EPs
Albums produced by Kurt Ballou